Angélica Tepper Kolossa (born 1961) is a Chilean entrepreneur who is member of the Chilean Constitutional Convention (CC).

She has been interviewed many times by CNN Chile or La Tercera in the context of the confrontation at the Araucanía Region between Mapuches and the Chilean landowners. In 2021, she run for a seat in the CC, which she reached on 18 May.

References

External links
 

Living people
1961 births
21st-century Chilean politicians
Members of the Chilean Constitutional Convention
21st-century Chilean women politicians